Katherine Miller (born May 9, 1994) is a Brazilian American fencer who was a member of Brazil's women's epee team at the 2016 Summer Olympics. She won the 2013 Brazilian Senior National Championship and was a member of Brazil's Bronze Medal winning Women's Epee Team at the 2016 Pan American Championships 

Miller studied global affairs at Yale University, where she was even captain of the fencing team.

References 

1994 births
Living people
American sportspeople of Brazilian descent
Brazilian people of American descent
Olympic fencers of Brazil
Fencers at the 2016 Summer Olympics
Brazilian female épée fencers
Sportspeople from New York City
Yale Bulldogs fencers
Yale University alumni
American female épée fencers